Gerberry is an English surname. Notable people with the surname include:

 Ron Gerberry, American politician

English-language surnames